Tierra del Fuego is an archipelago at the southernmost tip of South America, shared between Chile, and Argentina.

Tierra del Fuego may also refer to:

Places
Isla Grande de Tierra del Fuego, main island of the aforementioned archipelago
Tierra del Fuego Province, Chile
Tierra del Fuego Province, Argentina
Tierra del Fuego National Park, a national park on the Argentine part of the island

Entertainment
Tierra del Fuego (1948 film), a 1948 film by Mario Soffici
Tierra del Fuego (film), a 2000 film by Miguel Littín
La Tierra del Fuego, an album by Roy Campbell
Tierra del Fuego, an album by Argentine band Virus